Bødtker is a surname. Notable people with the surname include:

Carl Bødtker (1886–1980), Norwegian engineer and radio personality
Carl Fredrik Johannes Bødtker (1851–1928), Norwegian military officer, teacher, and writer
Erik Bødtker Øyno (born 1965), Norwegian businessperson and chief executive officer of Aktiv Kapital
Eyvind Bødtker (1867–1932), Norwegian chemist
Henning Bødtker (1891–1975), Norwegian jurist and civil servant
Job Dischington Bødtker (1818–1889), Norwegian jurist and politician
Johannes Sejersted Bødtker CBE (1879–1963), Norwegian banker, art collector and patron of the arts
Ragnvald Bødtker (1859–1946), Norwegian engineer, known as the director of log driving in Halden for 42 years
Sigurd Bødtker (1866–1928), Norwegian theatre critic

Norwegian-language surnames